The Monroe Twins were a professional Minor League Baseball club based in the city of Monroe, Louisiana. The Twins formed part of the Cotton States League from 1931 through 1932 (Class D), and returned in 1937 (Class C) to play for one more year. They were an affiliate of the St. Louis Cardinals during the 1932 season.

Season-by-season record

Major League Baseball alumni

Bill Baker (1932)
Josh Billings (1931)
Red Borom (1937)
Lou Chiozza (1931)
Bill Crouch (1932)
Ed Hock (1937)
Ted Jourdan (1931)
Hersh Martin (1932)
Wally Moses (1932)
Eddie Palmer (1931)
Culley Rikard (1937)
Abe White (1932)

Fact
Gordon Houston, who started his professional career with the Monroe Twins in the 1938 season, is best remembered for being the first player in Organized Baseball to die during active duty in World War II.

Sources

External links
Baseball Reference – Minor League History

Defunct Cotton States League teams
Defunct minor league baseball teams
Professional baseball teams in Louisiana
Twins
Baseball teams established in 1931
Sports clubs disestablished in 1937
1931 establishments in Louisiana
1937 disestablishments in Louisiana
Defunct baseball teams in Louisiana
St. Louis Cardinals minor league affiliates
Baseball teams disestablished in 1937